Kyle Loren Kingsbury (born March 22, 1982) is a retired American professional mixed martial artist. A professional competitor from 2006–2014, Kingsbury also formerly competed for King of the Cage and was a cast member of Spike TV's The Ultimate Fighter: Team Nogueira vs. Team Mir.

Background
Kingsbury attended Monta Vista High School in Cupertino, California. Kingsbury played high school football for the school, playing the defensive tackle position. He earned many titles such as: "Defensive Lineman of the Year" in the Santa Clara Valley League (2000), two-time first-team all-league selection (1999 and 2000), also earned second-team All-Central Coast Section honors behind first-team selection Jared Allen his senior year. Kingsbury was selected by the North squad for the North vs. South San Jose Charlie Wedemeyer All-Star football game, after a senior season where he racked up 53 tackles, 10 sacks and two fumble recoveries in his final year. Kyle was the captain for both his football team and his wrestling team. After graduating in 2000, Kyle attended Mesa Community College and earned his associate degree in 2003.

Football career
Kingsbury later transferred to Arizona State University (ASU). He was a walk-on for the football team where he was a scout team member in the 2003 season and saw playing time in the 2004 season, including in ASU's 2004 Sun Bowl victory over Purdue University.

Mixed martial arts

The Ultimate Fighter
Kingsbury fought Ryan Bader for a spot on the show, he lost to Bader by arm-triangle choke in the second round. After the discovery of two injured fighters, Kingsbury was brought in to replace one of them. He was picked by Antonio Nogueira's team and Nogueira called Kingsbury the leader of the team. In the first round of fights, Krzysztof Soszynski defeated Kingsbury. In the finale Kingsbury was matched up against Tom Lawlor. Kingsbury lost a unanimous decision to Lawlor at the Ultimate Fighter Finale.

Ultimate Fighting Championship
Kingsbury made his UFC debut against former The Ultimate Fighter: Team Nogueira vs. Team Mir castmate Tom Lawlor. He was defeated via unanimous decision on the preliminary card at The Ultimate Fighter 8 Finale. Even though Kingsbury did not win any fights on TUF and did not win his debut, the UFC decided to keep him signed.

At UFC 104, Kyle fought in his second UFC bout against Razak Al-Hassan. The fight went to the judges and was scored in the favor of Kyle who took a split decision.

Kingsbury defeated Jared Hamman via unanimous decision on September 15, 2010 at UFC Fight Night 22 in a bout that earned Fight of the Night honors.

Kingsbury improved his UFC record to 3-1 after a TKO victory over Ricardo Romero in 0:21 seconds of the first round, on February 5, 2011 at UFC 126.

Kingsbury faced Fábio Maldonado on June 4, 2011 at The Ultimate Fighter 13 Finale. He won the fight via unanimous decision and also earned the Fight of the Night honors for his performance.

Kingsbury next faced Stephan Bonnar on November 19, 2011 at UFC 139. He lost the fight via unanimous decision.

Kingsbury fought UFC newcomer, Glover Teixeira on May 26, 2012 at UFC 146. Kingsbury lost the fight via submission in the first round.

Kingsbury lost to debuting Jimi Manuwa on September 29, 2012 at UFC on Fuel TV 5 by TKO due to doctor stoppage. Kingsbury took tremendous punishment in the fight before the doctor ended the bout due to his left eye swelling shut. Kingsbury revealed on The MMA Hour that his orbital bone was fractured in two places but that it did not require surgery.

Kingsbury faced Patrick Cummins on July 26, 2014 at UFC on Fox 12. He lost the fight via unanimous decision (30–27, 30–25, and 30–24) and subsequently announced his retirement from MMA.

Acting
Kingsbury performed motion capture for Vietnam veteran turned criminal, Lincoln Clay, in Mafia III.

Championships and accomplishments
Ultimate Fighting Championship
Fight of the Night (Two times) vs. Jared Hamman, Fábio Maldonado

Mixed martial arts record 

|-
| Loss
| align=center| 11–6 (1)
| Patrick Cummins
| Decision (unanimous)
| UFC on Fox: Lawler vs. Brown
| 
| align=center| 3
| align=center| 5:00
| San Jose, California, United States
| 
|-
| Loss
| align=center| 11–5 (1)
| Jimi Manuwa
| TKO (doctor stoppage)
| UFC on Fuel TV: Struve vs. Miocic
| 
| align=center| 2
| align=center| 5:00
| Nottingham, England, United Kingdom
| 
|-
| Loss
| align=center| 11–4 (1)
| Glover Teixeira
| Submission (arm-triangle choke)
| UFC 146
| 
| align=center| 1
| align=center| 1:53
| Las Vegas, Nevada, United States
| 
|-
| Loss
| align=center| 11–3 (1)
| Stephan Bonnar
| Decision (unanimous)
| UFC 139
| 
| align=center| 3
| align=center| 5:00
| San Jose, California, United States
| 
|-
| Win
| align=center| 11–2 (1)
| Fábio Maldonado
| Decision (unanimous)
| The Ultimate Fighter 13 Finale
| 
| align=center| 3
| align=center| 5:00
| Las Vegas, Nevada, United States
| 
|-
| Win
| align=center| 10–2 (1)
| Ricardo Romero
| TKO (knees to the body and punches)
| UFC 126
| 
| align=center| 1
| align=center| 0:21
| Las Vegas, Nevada, United States
| 
|-
| Win
| align=center| 9–2 (1)
| Jared Hamman
| Decision (unanimous)
| UFC Fight Night: Marquardt vs. Palhares
| 
| align=center| 3
| align=center| 5:00
| Austin, Texas, United States
| 
|-
| Win
| align=center| 8–2 (1)
| Razak Al-Hassan
| Decision (split)
| UFC 104
| 
| align=center| 3
| align=center| 5:00
| Los Angeles, California, United States
| 
|-
| Loss
| align=center| 7–2 (1)
| Tom Lawlor
| Decision (unanimous)
| The Ultimate Fighter 8 Finale
| 
| align=center| 3
| align=center| 5:00
| Las Vegas, Nevada, United States
| 
|-
| Loss
| align=center| 7–1 (1)
| Tony Lopez
| TKO (punches)
| KOTC: River Rage
| 
| align=center| 1
| align=center| 1:36
| Laughlin, Nevada, United States
| 
|-
| Win
| align=center| 7–0 (1)
| Demian Decorah
| Decision (unanimous)
| KOTC: Battle at the Bowl
| 
| align=center| 2
| align=center| 5:00
| Lac du Flambeau, Wisconsin, United States
| 
|-
| NC
| align=center| 6–0 (1)
| Maurice Jackson
| NC
| KOTC: Eclipse
| 
| align=center| 1
| align=center| N/A
| San Carlos, Arizona, United States
| 
|-
| Win
| align=center| 6–0
| Angelo Mcleroy
| Submission (rear-naked choke)
| KOTC: Caged Chaos
| 
| align=center| 1
| align=center| 1:39
| Laughlin, Nevada, United States
| 
|-
| Win
| align=center| 5–0
| Rocky Batastini
| Submission (rear-naked choke)
| RITC 89: Triple Main Event
| 
| align=center| 1
| align=center| 0:19
| Fountain Hills, Arizona, United States
| 
|-
| Win
| align=center| 4–0
| Aric Dylan
| KO (punches)
| RITC 87: Rage in the Cage
| 
| align=center| 1
| align=center| 1:45
| Phoenix, Arizona, United States
| 
|-
| Win
| align=center| 3–0
| Brian Ryan
| Decision (unanimous)
| RITC 85: Xtreme Cage Fighting
| 
| align=center| 3
| align=center| 3:00
| Phoenix, Arizona, United States
| 
|-
| Win
| align=center| 2–0
| Dan Glasgow
| TKO (knee to the body and punches)
| RITC 84: Celebrity Theatre
| 
| align=center| 1
| align=center| 0:29
| Phoenix, Arizona, United States
| 
|-
| Win
| align=center| 1–0
| Joe Tsosie
| KO (knee)
| RITC 83: Rampage
| 
| align=center| 1
| align=center| 0:19
| Fountain Hills, Arizona, United States
|

References

External links

UFC Profile

1982 births
Living people
American male mixed martial artists
Mixed martial artists from California
Light heavyweight mixed martial artists
Ultimate Fighting Championship male fighters
Mesa Thunderbirds football players
Arizona State Sun Devils football players